Herbert E. Selwyn (April 25, 1925 - February 3, 2016) was an American attorney and businessperson. Selwyn worked as a criminal defense attorney and was counsel to the American Civil Liberties Union in the 1950s. His role as an LGBT rights advocate led to the incorporation of the first gay organization, the Mattachine Society.

Early life and education 
Selwyn was born on April 25, 1925, in Hollywood to Leo and Lily Seligmann. He was raised in West Hollywood, California, and graduated from Fairfax High School. Selwyn entered University of California, Los Angeles (UCLA) before enlisting in the United States Army Air Corps during World War II. Selwyn served in England, France, and Germany. He later reentered UCLA and graduated from USC Gould School of Law. Selwyn was admitted to the State Bar of California in 1950.

Career 
Selwyn set up a law practice and was a member of the American Civil Liberties Union (ACLU). He was a criminal defense attorney and taught at local law schools. Selwyn was passionate about civil rights, social and economic justice, and strongly opposed to the death penalty. At the request of one of his father's patients, a lesbian member of the Mattachine Society, Selwyn began providing legal support and expertise to the LGBT community. In the 1950s, he was counsel for the ACLU and assisted in the development of the organization's policy on LGBTQ rights. He assisted in incorporating the first gay organization, and helped in obtaining a permit for the first gay pride parade in Los Angeles. Selwyn served as chairman of the democratic council in California's 24th congressional district. In 1974, he was a candidate for the democratic nomination for the 24th congressional district. John Anson Ford endorsed Selwyn's candidacy. Towards the end of his career, Selwyn did arbitration and pro bono work.

Personal life 
Selwyn was married and had four children. He enjoyed tennis, music, reading, and travelling. Selwyn was a member of Mensa International and the Plato Society at UCLA. His son, Christopher, predeceased him. Selwyn died on February 3, 2016, after battling a long illness. He was survived by his wife, Lidia, and three children from a previous marriage.

Legacy 
Selwyn's role in the LGBTQ rights movement is featured in season 2, episode 7 of the podcast Making Gay History.

References 

1925 births
2016 deaths
20th-century American lawyers
21st-century American lawyers
Criminal defense lawyers
People from Hollywood, Los Angeles
People from West Hollywood, California
University of California, Los Angeles alumni
USC Gould School of Law alumni
United States Army Air Forces soldiers
California Democrats
20th-century American politicians
American LGBT rights activists
Activists from California
American social justice activists
20th-century American businesspeople
21st-century American businesspeople
Businesspeople from California
LGBT law in California
Fairfax High School (Los Angeles) alumni
1950s in LGBT history
American Civil Liberties Union people